The 1947–48 UMass Aggies men's ice hockey season was the 32nd season of play for the program but first under the oversight of the NCAA. The Aggies represented the University of Massachusetts Amherst and were coached by Thomas Filmore, in his 1st season.

Season
The newly renamed University of Massachusetts Amherst decided to revive its ice hockey program after laying dormant since 1939. To support the team, a temporary rink was built behind Fernald Hall and ex-pro player Thomas Filmore was brought in helm the team. Despite their best intentions, the program had to deal with some significant hurdles. Not least of which were that virtually none of the players had played college hockey before. Additionally, because they had started putting their schedule together so late in the school year, the Aggies had trouble getting other teams on their slate. However, the biggest issue was probably the lack of practice facilities. While the Fernald Hall Rink had been built in earnest, weather conditions rendered it unsuitable for long swaths of time. UMass was able to schedule six games, however, half of those were cancelled. After the first game on January 6 was scrapped, the team played a pair of contest just before the exam break and a third upon return. With the very poor play exhibited by the Aggies and no usable practice facilities to improve, the school decided to end the season early and hope for better conditions next year.

Roster

Standings

Schedule and results

|-
!colspan=12 style=";" | Regular Season

References

UMass Minutemen ice hockey seasons
UMass
UMass
UMass